The MIAG Mühlenbau und Industrie Aktiengesellschaft was a mechanical engineering company from Braunschweig, Germany which was acquired by Bühler in Uzwil, Switzerland in 1972.

The company was founded in 1925 in Frankfurt am Main from the merger of the resident Hugo Greffenius AG with four other grain mill manufacturers:

 Mühlenbauanstalt und Maschinenfabrik vorm. Gebrüder Seck – Dresden-Zschachwitz, founded 1873
 Maschinenfabrik für Mühlenbau, vorm. C.G.W. Kapler Akt.Ges. – Berlin, founded. 1875
 G. Luther, Maschinenfabrik und Mühlenbau (Luther-Werke) – Braunschweig, founded 1875
 Braunschweigische Mühlenbauanstalt Amme, Giesecke & Konegen (AGK) – founded in 1895 by former Luther employees Ernst Amme, Carl Giesecke Julius Konegen

External links
 

Companies based in Braunschweig
Defunct motor vehicle manufacturers of Germany
Machine manufacturers
Grinding mills
1925 establishments in Germany
is a former mechanical engineering company from Brunswick, Germany, which was acquired in 1972 by the company Gebrüder Bühler in Uzwil, Switzerland